The Republic of Ireland possesses no active volcanoes. Volcanic activity in the country occurred primarily between 480–430 mya (million years ago), during the Ordovician geological age.

List

References

Republic of Ireland